Al Muharrir (the Liberator or the Editor) was an Arabic-language daily newspaper published in Morocco. It was in circulation between December 1974 and June 1981.

History and profile
Al Muharrir was first published in December 1964. The daily was the organ of the Socialist Union of Popular Forces party. Therefore, it had a socialist leaning and oppositional stance.

Omar Benjelloun served as the editor-in-chief of the paper who was assassinated on 18 December 1975. Later Mustafa Karchawi assumed the post. Mohammed Abed Al Jabri, a Moroccan critic and academic, was among the significant contributors of the paper from its start in 1964. Abdelkerim Mouti was another regular contributor.

In November 1965 Al Muharrir was banned in Morocco, and its editor-in-chief was jailed for ten months. The daily was relaunched after six months. Together with other opposition papers, including Al Alam and L'Opinion, it was frequently suspended during the mid-1970s.

Al Muharrir ceased publication in June 1981. It was succeeded by Al Ittihad Al Ichtiraki which was first published in May 1983.

References

1964 establishments in Morocco
1981 disestablishments in Morocco
Arabic-language newspapers
Banned newspapers
Defunct newspapers published in Morocco
Publications established in 1964
Publications disestablished in 1981
Socialist newspapers